Principe Channel is a strait on the North Coast of British Columbia, Canada, located between Banks Island (W) and Pitt Island (E).  "Principe" means "prince" in Spanish.

Notes

References

North Coast of British Columbia
Spanish history in the Pacific Northwest
Channels of British Columbia